Mazhakaaru is a 1973 Indian Malayalam-language film, directed by P. N. Menon and produced by S. K. Nair. The film stars Madhu, Kanakadurga, Roja Ramani (Sobhana) and KPAC Lalitha. It is based on the novel of the same name by G. Vivekanandan.

Plot

Cast 

Madhu as Prabhakaran
Kanakadurga as Malathi
Roja Ramani (Sobhana) as Shantha
KPAC Lalitha as Meenakshi
Sankaradi as Swami
Raghavan
Adoor Bhavani as Malathi's Mother
Baby Sheela
Balan K. Nair
Janardanan as Soman
Kottarakkara Sreedharan Nair
Kuthiravattam Pappu as Maniyan
M. G. Soman
Madhubala
P. K. Venukkuttan Nair
P. O. Thomas
P. R. Menon
Radhadevi
Xavier
Valsala
Meera
Anitha

Soundtrack 
The music was composed by G. Devarajan and the lyrics were written by Vayalar Ramavarma.

References

External links 
 

1970s Malayalam-language films
1973 films
Films based on Indian novels
Films directed by P. N. Menon (director)